The Classic Tetris World Championship (CTWC) is a video game competition series, hosted by the Portland Retro Gaming Expo.
The competition launched in 2010, during the filming of Ecstasy of Order: The Tetris Masters to determine the world's greatest Tetris player. In its first two years, the competition was held in Los Angeles, California, but was moved to Portland, Oregon, in 2012, and has been held there annually since (with the exceptions of the 2020 and 2021 tournaments, held online due to the COVID-19 pandemic).

The contestants play the 1989 Nintendo version of Tetris on actual Nintendo Entertainment System consoles and CRT televisions. The final rounds are streamed online with live-edited screens and heads-up display to improve viewer experience. The tournament was initially dominated by Jonas Neubauer, who reached the finals in the first nine iterations of the tournament and won seven titles.

Since Neubauer's final win in 2017, the tournament has been dominated by hypertapping, a style of playing in which the player rapidly taps the controller's D-pad to move pieces. This is in contrast to the delayed auto-shift (DAS) technique, in which the player simply holds down the D-pad to move the piece. Hypertapping is especially prevalent among a recent influx of younger players. Joseph Saelee won back-to-back titles while in high school, including a win against Neubauer in the 2018 final and one against Koji "Koryan" Nishio in the 2019 final. Thirteen-year-old Michael "dogplayingtetris" Artiaga won the 2020 edition of the tournament, beating his brother Andrew "PixelAndy" Artiaga in the final. The younger Artiaga then successfully defended his title in 2021, defeating Jacob "Huffulufugus" Huff three games to one.

Although Huff fell short, he showed the effectiveness of a brand-new style of play, known as "rolling." Originally introduced by CTWC regular Chris "Cheez" Martinez, the player taps the back of the controller with one hand, into the fingers of the other, which are pressed on the D-pad. The new strategy has brought in a wave of scoring records and has seen former hypertappers (including the Artiagas), adopt the playing style.

The 2022 tournament, held in Portland for the first time in three years, was dominated by rollers. Eric "EricICX" Tolt and Justin "Fractal" Yu each broke the qualifying record with 14 max-outs, then advanced through eliminations to face each other in the final match. In a memorable duel, Tolt outlasted Yu to win the title three games to one. The match may be most remembered for the third game, which saw both players exceed 2.1 million points, with Tolt winning the game and later the crown.

Competition
The competition takes place over two days, with the Qualifying Round on the first day and the Main Event on the second. Contestants are allowed to bring their own controller, but it must be either an original, unmodified NES Controller or an aftermarket unit that is deemed a faithful enough reproduction of one. At the conclusion of the competition, the champion and 2nd-place finisher are awarded a golden and silver T-tetromino trophy respectively. After the sudden death of Jonas Neubauer in January 2021, it was announced during the 2021 championship that the tournament trophy was renamed to the Jonas Neubauer Trophy, redesigned as a golden J-tetromino, representing the "J" for "Jonas".

Qualifying round
Qualifying takes place on a fixed number of NES stations. Entrants play "Type A" Tetris, starting on level 9 or higher, and are seeded based on their final score. Once an entrant's game ends for any reason, his/her score must be recorded by a tournament scorekeeper in order to be valid. Entrants may make as many qualifying attempts as they wish, but must return to the back of the waiting line for each one. Entrants may also pay a fee to rent a station for one hour, which allows unlimited qualifying attempts. In 2022, lines were removed in favor rental stations. Players register for a two hour slot, which allows unlimited qualifying attempts.

The top 32 scorers are seeded into a tournament bracket for the Main Event. In 2018, 40 players were allowed to qualify, with a "Round Zero" play-off held among the bottom 16 seeds to reduce the field to 32. Forty-eight players qualified in 2016; the top 16 seeds automatically advanced, while the remaining 32 competed in "Round Zero" to fill the other 16 slots. In the event of multiple players maxing out (scoring 999,999 or higher), their second highest score is recorded to determine their seeding. This was especially utilized in 2018, when seven players maxed out, four of whom (Koji "Koryan" Nishio, Tomohiro "Green Tea" Tatejima, Jonas Neubauer and Harry Hong) maxed out twice. Thus, the officials needed their third highest scores just to determine the 1st to 4th seeding.

Main event

The Main Event is a single-elimination tournament consisting of five rounds of head-to-head matches, with seeds from opposite ends of the rankings pitted against each other in the first round (i.e. #1 vs. #32, #2 vs. #31, etc.). Matches are played with specially modified cartridges that can display seven-figure scores and give both players the same sequence of randomly determined blocks. Prior to the 2016 tournament, the Main Event was played using unmodified cartridges.

Both players begin to play "Type A" Tetris at the same time on separate systems, and the game continues until one of the following occurs:

 Trailing player "tops-out," or allows the blocks to reach the top of the screen (leader wins)
 Leader tops-out; trailing player fails to match that score before topping-out (leader wins)
 Leader tops-out; trailing player passes that score (trailing player wins)

During the first round, the higher-seeded player in a match chooses whether the first game will start at level 15 or 18. The lower seed chooses for the second game, and the higher seed for the third (if necessary). Starting with the second round, all games begin at level 18. Starting in 2022, all games begin at Level 18.

Tournaments

2010

The inaugural edition of CTWC was held at the Downtown Independent theater in Los Angeles, California, on August 8, 2010. Los Angeles was chosen as the location of the tournament because several high-ranking players lived there. The main event took place in a theater room, with the players' game boards projected onto the large screen behind them.

The 2010 championship had the flavor of an invitational tournament due to its original concept; five of the eight seats in the semifinals were automatically issued to certain distinguished players. The top two Tetris score recordholders Jonas Neubauer and Harry Hong, who had each achieved the maximum score of 999,999 points, were invited. Also included were the top two record-holders for the most lines cleared in a single game, Ben Mullen (296 lines) and Jesse Kelkar (291 lines). The final reserved seat was given to Thor Aackerlund, the champion of the 1990 Nintendo World Championships. Three spots were remaining for qualifiers: the top 3 players in the "Type B" games (on level 18–0) in a certain period could join the semifinal.

The 8-player semifinals had 3 rounds of "Type A" games in order to determine the two finalists. Each player had their line count (in the first round) or score (in rounds 2 and 3) calculated as a percentage of the highest line count or score reached by a player in that round. The percentages in the three rounds were averaged together, and the two players with the highest averages advanced to the final. The final was a best-of-3 "Type A" game.

Hong and Neubauer performed well in all three rounds of the semifinals and advanced to the final. In game 1, Hong suffered from misdrops, and despite pulling off a daring I-piece tuck, was unable to recover his position and topped-out. In game 2, Hong had built a 50,000-point lead before topping-out, allowing Neubauer to catch up and win the title with a level-23 tetris.

An award-winning documentary about Tetris and the 2010 Classic Tetris World Championship, Ecstasy of Order: The Tetris Masters, was released in 2011.

Neubauer won the inaugural edition CTWC, winning a cash prize of $1,000, which would get increased to $10,000 at future events.

2011
The second annual championship was held at the University of Southern California's Bovard Auditorium on October 16, 2011.

The concept of assigned spots in the semifinals did not carry over to the 2011 championship. In the qualifying, the top 8 scorers of "Type B" games advanced to the main tournament. An additional 100,000 points were awarded for completing Level 19. The main tournament was a single-elimination tournament consisting of three rounds, and all matches were the best of three.

Neubauer successfully defended his title against Alex Kerr in the final. In addition to the main event, tournaments were also held for Tetris for PlayStation 3 (including both a solo and 2 vs 2 team tournament, with best-of-seven matches) and for the tabletop game Tetris Link.

2012
As the tournament moved to the Portland Retro Gaming Expo, the rules were renewed and established as the current rules:
The qualifying uses "Type A" game and the top 32 players are seeded to the main tournament bracket. ("Type B" games are no longer used)
The main event is a single-elimination tournament with four rounds and a final. Matches in the rounds are played best of three (first to two games) while the final is played best of five (first to three).
The standings between players reached the same round are determined by 1) games won in the losing match, and 2) combined scores of the two games lost in the losing round.
Neubauer won his third successive title

2013 
Neubauer won his fourth consecutive championship in a Neubauer–Hong rematch of the inaugural 2010 final.

2014 
For the first time, Neubauer is dethroned as the champion, with Hong successfully claiming his first and so far only title. After the tournament, Neubauer contemplated retirement but was convinced to keep competing by his wife.

2015
A slight change was applied in determining the rankings: if players are tied for rounds advanced and games won in a losing match, the sum of two games in the losing match plus qualification score was used. However, this rule was used only in 2015 and 2016. Neubauer reclaimed his crown for a fifth championship title, beating Sean Ritchie (aka "Quaid") in the final.

2016
From 2016, the contenders play with specially modified cartridges during the main tournament. The modified cartridge can count the score in 7 digits and enables each player to receive the same order of pieces, in order to avoid the inequity of I-piece supplies and the periods of I-piece droughts. The referee rolls two 10-sided dice before each game to determine a random seed (and the random seeds in the cartridge are changed every year).

Qualifying games are still played with the original unmodified cartridges.

Neubauer earned his sixth victory. Also, for the first time, a non-American player placed in the top 4: Japanese player Koji Nishio ("Koryan").

2017 
Neubauer claimed his 7th and final victory before his sudden death in 2021 at age 39.

2018
The number of players for the main tournament draw was expanded from 32 to 40, with a "Round Zero" play-off introduced for qualifiers ranked #25 to #40. The winner of each "Round Zero" match faced one of the top 8 seeds in the first round proper (winner of #25/#40 vs. #8, #26/#39 vs. #7, etc.)

Sixteen-year-old hypertapper Joseph Saelee became just the third unique player to win the main event; the runner-up is Neubauer. Hypertapping is a physically demanding skill that allows for quicker sideways movement, although it has only been mastered by a handful of players before being superseded by the easier rolling technique in 2021, which was first implemented at the 2022 CTWC. As of 2023, the video replay of the game has been seen by more than 18 million people.

2019 
The number of players for the main tournament draw was expanded from 40 to 48, with a "Round Zero" play-off for qualifiers ranked #17 to #48. The winner of each "Round Zero" match faced one of the top 16 seeds in the first round proper (winner of #17/#48 vs. #16, #18/#47 vs. #15, etc.) 

Matches in rounds 0–2 are played best of three, while rounds 3–5 are played best of five.

Saelee won back-to-back titles, defeating Koji Nishio.

2020 
Due to the COVID-19 pandemic, the event was held online with a different set of rules from the in-person tournaments.

Qualifying:

 Players have 2 hours to make unlimited qualifying attempts, with the Top 64 being seeded for the Double-Elimination tournament.

Double-Elimination Playoffs (Top 64):

 The Top 64 are distributed among eight separate 8-seeded Double-Elimination Brackets.
 All matches are a Best of Five, with all games starting at Level 18. 
 Players do NOT get the same order of pieces, as they use the original unmodified cartridges.
 The winner of each bracket advances to the Top 8.

Single-Elimination Playoffs (Top 8):

 The Top 8 are reseeded based on their Top 64 performance.
 All matches are a Best of Five, with all games starting at Level 18.
 Players get the same order of pieces, as they use the specially modified cartridges.
Michael Artiaga (aka dogplayingtetris) won the final. At just 13 years and 16 days, he's the youngest-ever champion. He defeated his 15-year-old brother Andrew Artiaga (aka P1xelAndy),

2021 
Artiaga scored back-to-back CTWC victories by defeating Jacob Huff in the final.

2022 
The CTWC returned to the Portland Retro Gaming Expo as an In-Person tournament with a similar format to 2019.

The number of players for the main tournament draw was expanded from 40 to 48, with a "Round Zero" play-off for qualifiers ranked #17 to #48. The winner of each "Round Zero" match faced one of the top 16 seeds in the first round proper (winner of #17/#48 vs. #16, #18/#47 vs. #15, etc.)

Qualifying

 In Qualifying, players have 2 hours to make unlimited qualifying attempts on rental stations.

Playoffs

 The Top 48 advance to the main tournament
 All matches are a Best of Five, with all games starting at Level 18.
Eric Tolt won the 13th CTWC final.

Results

Official rankings each year

Notable achievements
 First level 30 in qualifying round of CTWC: Joseph Saelee, 2018
 First level 31 in qualifying round of CTWC: Joseph Saelee, 2019
 First max-out in CTWC tournament: Joseph Saelee, 2019
First double max-out in CTWC tournament: Joseph Saelee and Tomohiro Tatejima, 2019
First double 1.1 million score in CTWC tournament: Michael Artiaga and Koji Nishio, 2020
First double 1.3 million score in CTWC tournament: Michael Artiaga and Minjun Kim ("Pokenerd"), 2021
First double 1.5 million score in CTWC tournament: Justin Yu and Eric Tolt, 2022
First double 2.1 million score in CTWC tournament: Eric Tolt and Justin Yu, 2022
First level 73 in CTWC tournament: Eric Tolt, 2022

Official Classic Tetris World Championship global stops 
Since 2018, global CTWC stops have been officially added, many of which are directly linked to the CTWC main event in Portland. Other than prizes, the winner of each global stop is sponsored to fly to Portland and try to qualify for the finals.

Similar events and side events 
During the expo there have been several tournaments on other systems over the years.
Tetris on the PlayStation 3: 4-player 2-vs-2 team battle with no items (2011)
Tetris Ultimate on the PlayStation 4: versus mode (2015)
Tetris & Dr. Mario on SNES: Tetris versus mode, held as a tournament for those who didn't participate in the main event (2016-2017)
Tetris: The Grand Master 2 on Arcade: versus mode with no items (2016)
Tetris: The Grand Master on Arcade: regular games racing for the fastest time (2017)
Tetris Effect on the PlayStation 4: separate gameplays on Journey mode and Mystery mode (2018)
Nintendo NES Tetris with extra rules: no next preview from Level 18, and race from Level 0 to Level 19 (2018)

Classic Tetris Monthly (CTM) 
There is a once-a-month online tournament called Classic Tetris Monthly (CTM) that was previously hosted on the same Twitch channel as the CTWC, but it now is hosted on MonthlyTetris. Competitors routinely compete from around the world in CTM, which is streamed remotely and thus allows for great flexibility on the part of the competitors. CTM is overseen and commentated chiefly by Keith "vandweller" Didion, who took over for Jessica "fridaywitch" Starr, the tournament's founder, in the Summer of 2018. Starr premiered the tournament on December 3, 2017, on her personal Twitch channel, with 16 participants that had qualified in the few weeks leading up to the event. Harry Hong, the 2014 CTWC champion, was the tournament's first victor. Didion opened a Twitch account dedicated to CTM, called MonthlyTetris, shortly after he began hosting.

Classic Tetris European Championship (CTEC) 
Since 2015, a Classic Tetris European Championship has been played annually in Copenhagen. The tournament follows a similar structure, but is played on the PAL version of NES Tetris rather than the NTSC version. Due to the difference in framerates, the two versions of the game (both of which are designed for the NES) are balanced differently; pieces do not fall at identical speeds on the same level between the two versions. In addition, Delay Auto Shift (DAS) is faster in PAL compared to NTSC. At higher level play, this leads to significant differences in strategy and outcome. In particular, players who employ DAS as their primary strategy are able to play at the highest level.

See also 

Nintendo World Championships
Nintendo PowerFest '94
Nintendo Campus Challenge
Tetris Effect: Connected

References

Further reading

External links
 Official Classic Tetris World Championship Site
 Official Facebook Page
 YouTube channel
 Twitch channel
 Portland Retro Gaming Expo

Nintendo events
Tetris
Tetris